Black & White is a studio album by American country music artist Janie Frickie. It was released via Columbia Records in July 1986. The project marked the eleventh studio album released in Frickie's music career. The album contained ten tracks of material that mixed country with blues styles. It was the first and only album in Fricke's career to top the America's Billboard country LP's chart. Its two single releases would reach Billboard chart positions, beginning with "Always Have, Always Will."

Background and content
Janie Frickie had become among the most commercially-successful country artists of the 1980s, having a series of number one and top ten songs. Her popular recordings varies in musical styles that ranged from ballads to up-tempo country pop material. These styles changed with each producer Frickie worked with during the decade. After working on several albums with Bob Montgomery, Fricke collaborated with producer Norro Wilson for 1986's Black & White. The album was produced in March 1986 at the Merit Recording Studio, located in Nashville, Tennessee. Wilson served as the project's only producer. 

Black & White was a collection of ten tracks. The album consisted of both new recordings and covers of previously-recorded material. Among its new tracks was Frickie's self-penned "I'd Take You Back Again", Kent Robbins's "Treat Me Like a Vacation" and Johnny Mears's "Always Have, Always Will". Also included was a cover of the country song "Till I Can't Take It Anymore". Billy Joe Royal would later take his version of the song to the top five on the Billboard country chart in 1989.

Release, reception and singles
Black & White was originally released in July 1986 on Columbia Records. It was Frickie's eleventh studio album released in her career. The album was distributed as a vinyl LP, cassette and compact disc. In later years, the disc was re-released to digital platforms including Apple Music. Due to constant mispronunciations of her last name, Columbia changed the spelling from "Fricke" to "Frickie" for Black & White. The album was the first in Fricke's career to reach the number one spot on the Billboard Top Country Albums chart. The disc received positive review from critics. Jack Hurst of the Chicago Tribune described it as "excellent" in 1986. Writer Kurt Wolff praised Fricke's voice, calling it "gutsy" and "bluesy".

Two singles were spawned from Black & White. The first was "Always Have, Always Will", which was issued by Columbia Records in June 1986. The song reached the number one spot on Billboards Hot Country Songs chart in October 1986. It was Fricke's final number one single in her career. In October 1986, "When a Woman Cries" was issued as the second and final single. In early 1987, the single peaked at number 20 on the Billboard country chart, becoming her last top 20 song in her career. Both singles reached similar chart positions on Canada's RPM Country survey. "Always Have, Always Will" topped the RPM chart while "When a Woman Cries" climbed to the number ten spot. 

Track listing
Vinyl and cassette versions

Compact disc and digital versions

Personnel
All credits are adapted from the liner notes of Black & White.Musical personnel Michael Bowden – Musician
 Eddie Burton – Musician
 Thomas Brumley – Musician
 Steve Cropper – Musician
 Walter Cunningham – Musician
 Janie Frickie – Lead vocals
 John Gardner – Musician
 Vickie Hampton – Background vocals
 James Horn – Musician
 Ronnie Hughes – Musician
 Bill Hullett – Musician

 Mike Lawler – Musician
 Sam Levine – Musician
 Randy McCormick – Musician
 John Neel – Musician
 Gary Nicholson – Musician
 Gary Prim – Musician
 Lisa Silver – Background vocals
 Robb Strandlund – Musician
 Diane Tidwell – Background vocals
 John Ware – Musician
 Bill Warren – Background vocals
 Tony Wiggins – Background vocals
 Benny Wilson – Background vocalsTechnical personnel'
 Denny – Lacquer cut
 Tom Pick – Engineer
 Danny Purcell – Mastering
 Randee St. Nicholas – Photography
 Norro Wilson – Producer

Charts

Weekly charts

Year-end charts

Release history

References

1986 albums
Albums produced by Norro Wilson
Janie Fricke albums
Columbia Records albums